Jessore Road metro station is a metro station of Kolkata Metro Line 4. It the only surface level station in Line 4.

See also 

 Joka metro station
 Esplanade metro station
Dum Dum metro station

References

External links 

 Official website of Metro Railway, Kolkata

Kolkata Metro stations